Tekos may refer to:
 Teko people, an Amerindian tribe in French Guiana
 TeKoS, a Belgian "Nieuw Rechts" publication